Ukrainsky is a rural locality (a khutor) in Iskrinskoye Rural Settlement, Uryupinsky District, Volgograd Oblast, Russia. The population was 55 as of 2010.

Geography 
Ukrainsky is located in steppe, 58 km west of Uryupinsk (the district's administrative centre) by road. Loshchinovsky is the nearest rural locality.

References 

Rural localities in Uryupinsky District